Kathryn Karen King (born May 24, 1975) is an American ice hockey player. Raised in Salem, New Hampshire, she won a gold medal at the 1998 Winter Olympics, silver medal at the 2002 Winter Olympics and a bronze medal at the 2006 Winter Olympics. She graduated from Brown University in 1997. While at Brown, she also played softball, and was selected as the Ivy League Softball Player of the Year in 1996.

King graduated from Brown University in 1997 with 123 goals and 83 assists in 100 games. King also played for the US National Women's Team. At six World Championships, King registered 36 points in 30 games. At the 2001 tournament, she had a tournament-high seven goals. She also played for the 2005 gold medal winning team. At the end of her Olympic career, she ranked first all time amongst Americans in Olympic scoring with 23 points. She has won gold (Nagano), silver (Salt Lake City) and bronze (Torino) during her Olympic career.

In 2003, King became an assistant women's ice hockey coach for the Boston College Eagles women's ice hockey program and was named the head coach in 2007 following the resignation of former head coach Tom Mutch.

Head coaching record

Awards and honors
 2006 USA Hockey Women 's Player of the Year Award  (also known as the Bob Allen Women's Player of the Year award) 
 2× AHCA Coach of the Year (2015, 2016)

NCAA
1994 Kate Silver '86 Award (awarded by Brown University) 
1996 All-ECAC Team
1997 Marjorie Brown Smith Award
 1997 ECAC Player of the Year Award

References

1975 births
American women's ice hockey players
Boston College Eagles women's ice hockey coaches
Brown Bears women's ice hockey players
Ice hockey people from New Hampshire
Ice hockey players at the 1998 Winter Olympics
Ice hockey players at the 2002 Winter Olympics
Ice hockey players at the 2006 Winter Olympics
Living people
Medalists at the 1998 Winter Olympics
Medalists at the 2002 Winter Olympics
Medalists at the 2006 Winter Olympics
Olympic bronze medalists for the United States in ice hockey
Olympic gold medalists for the United States in ice hockey
Olympic silver medalists for the United States in ice hockey
People from Salem, New Hampshire
Sportspeople from Rockingham County, New Hampshire